Mariusz Dąbrowski (born 18 November 1976) is a Polish wrestler. He competed in the men's freestyle 69 kg at the 2000 Summer Olympics.

References

External links
 

1976 births
Living people
Polish male sport wrestlers
Olympic wrestlers of Poland
Wrestlers at the 2000 Summer Olympics
People from Koszalin